The Joseph H. Gray House, at 457 Court St. in Reno, Nevada, United States, is a historic house that was built in 1911.  It includes Colonial Revival details in a form having Queen Anne-style massing.  It was listed on the National Register of Historic Places in 1987.  The listing included two contributing buildings.

It was built for Reno department store owner Joseph H. Gray.

References 

Houses in Reno, Nevada
Colonial Revival architecture in Nevada
Houses completed in 1911
Houses on the National Register of Historic Places in Nevada
National Register of Historic Places in Reno, Nevada
Queen Anne architecture in Nevada